Johor Bahru City Square is a shopping centre and office building close to the Johor–Singapore Causeway which borders the two countries in Wong Ah Fook Street, Johor Bahru, Johor, Malaysia.

History
The building was opened in 1999. In 2000, the Mega Pavilion Cinema has been upgraded to Cathay Cineplex with new theatres at both level 5 and level 7. In 2005, the Singapore Visitor Centre was launched at the shopping mall. In December 2008, a pedestrian bridge connecting the building to JB Sentral was opened. In mid-2016, Cathey Cineplex was changed to mmCineplexes while the facilities still remain the same.

Architecture
The building interior consists of a seven-storey mall with five levels of retail outlet space, including a thirty-six storey office block, which is divided into the lower, middle and upper zones. City Square has three floors of the basement car park. Level 6 has an outdoor garden, a pond and a green wall.

Business
The shopping mall includes several anchor tenants and has various clothes, shoes, bags, electronic stores.

The shopping mall receives around 1.5 million visitors monthly.  Due in part to its proximity to the Johor-Singapore Causeway, City Square attracts many shoppers from Singapore.

Ownership
The mall has a majority ownership by the Government of Singapore Investment Corporation (GIC), a Singaporean sovereign wealth fund, who owns more than 70% of City Square's shares. The remaining shares are divided between the Johor Bahru City Council and Iskandar Puteri City Council respectively.

See also
 List of shopping malls in Malaysia

References

External links

 

1999 establishments in Malaysia
Shopping malls in Johor Bahru
Shopping malls established in 1999
20th-century architecture in Malaysia